Surrender - Hell! is a 1959 American film based on the exploits of Donald Blackburn in World War II, fighting as a guerrilla leader during the Japanese occupation of the Philippines.

Plot
Don Blackburn is stationed in the Philippines at the outset of World War II. After the order to surrender in 1942, Blackburn flees rather than becoming a prisoner. Helped by civilians, he eventually makes his way into the mountains of Luzon, where he organizes the headhunter tribes into a guerrilla force. Along with other similar forces, they liberate northern Luzon to aid in the reconquest of the Philippines.

Cast
Keith Andes as Colonel Donald D. Blackburn
Susan Cabot as Delia Guerrero
Paraluman as Pilar
Nestor de Villa as Major Bulao
Vic Diaz as Village Market Owner (uncredited)

References

External links

Surrender Hell at BFI

1959 films
American biographical films
American war films
American films based on actual events
Films set in the Philippines
Pacific War films
World War II films based on actual events
1950s American films